The Queensland Breakers is an Australian club water polo team that competes in the National Water Polo League.  They have a men's team and a women's team and are based in Brisbane.

References

External links
 

Water polo clubs in Australia
Sports clubs established in 2003
2003 establishments in Australia
Sporting clubs in Brisbane